"You're a Jerk" is a song by the duo New Boyz from their debut studio album Skinny Jeans and a Mic. It was produced by New Boyz member Legacy, and peaked at #24 on the Billboard Hot 100 chart.

Music video 

The music video was directed by Matt Alonzo of Skee. TV. At the beginning of the video Legacy gets a text message reading "You're a jerk". It then cuts to more people dancing on the street. Tyga and Paul Wall make cameos in the video. The video contains dancing by popular jerkin' crews UF Jerk Kings, The Ranger$ and Action Figures. The leaked and the video version of the song samples "Scotty" by Fabo of D4L.

Track listing 

 Digital download
 "You're a Jerk" - 3:09

 Digital download EP 
 "You're a Jerk" - 3:09
 "You're a Jerk" (music video) - 3:20

 "You're a Jerk/Dot Com" Maxi Single 
 "You're a Jerk" (Webstar Remix) - 3:47
 "You're a Jerk" (Fabo Remix) - 3:47
 "You're a Jerk" (JumpSmoker Remix) - 3:22
 "You're a Jerk (Versatile Remix) - 5:50
 "Dot Com" - 3:31

Charts

Weekly charts

Year-end charts

References 

2009 debut singles
New Boyz songs
2009 songs
Asylum Records singles
Warner Records singles